Mohammad Akram Raza (Urdu: محمد اکرم رضا) (born 1964) is a former Pakistani cricketer who played in nine Test matches and 49 One Day Internationals from 1989 to 1995.

Playing career
Born 29 November 1964 at Lahore, Punjab, Raza began his domestic cricket career for Lahore City at the age of 16.

In 1989 he made his international debut for Pakistan in a one-day international match against Australia. He made his final appearance for Pakistan in February 1995 having played in nine Tests and 49 one day internationals.

Raza was named in a 2000 corruption report by Justice Malik Mohammad Qayyum resulting in a fine from the Pakistan Cricket Board.

Umpiring career
After retiring from playing Raza took up umpiring, reaching domestic level in 2008.

2011: Arrest for illegal betting 
On Sunday 15 May 2011 a raid was carried out by Punjab Police in a Lahore shopping mall, there Raza along with six other men were arrested for betting on Indian Premier League matches, police recovered telephones, computers, televisions and a large amount of money during the raid, all seven men were charged later the same day.

2012: Reinstated as umpire 
Akram Raza, has been reinstated to the Pakistan Cricket Board umpiring panel, following his suspension for his alleged involvement in an illegal betting racket. After year-long proceedings in a Lahore court, he regained his PCB role. Javed Miandad, Pakistan Cricket Board director general, defended his appointment, saying the umpire had produced proof that he was innocent.

References 

1964 births
Living people
Pakistan Test cricketers
Pakistan One Day International cricketers
Sargodha cricketers
Habib Bank Limited cricketers
Pakistani cricket umpires
Pakistani cricketers
Cricketers from Lahore
Lahore City cricketers
Water and Power Development Authority cricketers
Lahore City Blues cricketers
Lahore City Whites cricketers